Midnight Syndicate is an American musical duo that has been working primarily in the genre of neoclassical dark ambient music since 1997 and is based in Chardon, Ohio, a suburb of Cleveland.

The band refers to their CDs as "soundtracks for the imagination" or "soundtracks to imaginary films".  Their songs are characterized by a blend of instrumental music and sound effects and are commonly used to provide atmosphere during the Halloween season, in haunted attractions, theme parks, and in the role-playing game industry.

History

Formation and early years (1996–1998)
Composer/filmmaker Edward Douglas formed Midnight Syndicate in 1996 shortly after releasing a micro-budget, direct-to-video horror film called The Dead Matter (1996) which he directed and scored and would later remake.  Midnight Syndicate's self-titled debut album was released the following year.  A majority of music on the album was written, arranged, and performed by Edward Douglas. Contributors included Scott Angus, Mark Rakocy, Dennis Carleton, Jamie Barbour, Ray Portler, the rap act Dark Side, and Christopher Robichaud.  Douglas coined the term cine-fusion to describe the album. Cine-fusion is described in the album's liner notes as
"a blending of movie soundtrack music and pop music ... a compilation of soundtracks to movies that do not exist.  The goal of the music is to stimulate the imaginations of listeners so that they are able to transport themselves to worlds or movies of their own creation."
Musically, the album contained an eclectic blend of styles including everything from dark instrumental music (of which three tracks appeared on future releases), rock, rock-a-billy, techno, rap, new-age, humor-pop, jazz, and space. Movie-style sound effects were employed in some tracks. In March 1998, a multimedia show was produced by Douglas and his company, Entity Productions, to support the album. The show included a blending of original short films, live music, animation, and stage performers.

Breakout (1998–2000)
In 1998, Douglas teamed up with gothic fantasy artist Joseph Vargo, and the two decided to create an exclusively dark-themed instrumental Midnight Syndicate album, "the result of Joseph Vargo's desire to produce an album that people could play in the background of their Halloween parties." Vargo developed the storyline and concept of a musical journey through a haunted castle, with the music reflecting his gothic artwork, "in addition to being integral to many of the creative decisions on the album." Composer Gavin Goszka, formerly a solo artist in a project called Lore, also joined Douglas and Vargo in the new Midnight Syndicate line-up. Together, they created Born of the Night, a groundbreaking album that appealed to fans of gothic music, the horror genre, and haunted attractions. Douglas and Goszka wrote and performed the music on the album while Vargo served as executive producer and creative director of the project, as well as writing and performing the vocals and narrations, and designing the cover art and packaging. The album and songs were also titled after several of Vargo's most popular paintings. Born of the Night was independently released in September 1998 through Vargo's Monolith Graphics and Douglas' Entity Productions, hitting the horror market just in time for the Halloween season. It was Midnight Syndicate's first critically acclaimed gothic-horror soundtrack and proved to be an instant success, establishing Midnight Syndicate's trademark sound.

In March 2000, Realm of Shadows followed suit with the same flavor of dark instrumental music and another gothic setting. Douglas and Goszka wrote all of the music for this album while Vargo wrote and performed the opening narration and theme story. Again, the songs were titled after Vargo's artworks. Both albums were featured as official soundtracks for Universal Studios' Halloween Horror Nights, and used in several other major theme parks during Halloween, such as Busch Gardens, Cedar Point, Kennywood Park, and Thorpe Park's Fright Nights event. The heavy metal band King Diamond also featured tracks from Born of the Night as opening music for their 2000 US tour.  Afterwards, Vargo and Midnight Syndicate chose to work separately of one another on future projects.

Rise (2001–2006)
Midnight Syndicate's third gothic horror soundtrack, Gates of Delirium, was released in 2001. This time Douglas and Goszka teamed up with two members who worked on the first Midnight Syndicate CD, Mark Rakocy (graphic design) and Christopher Robichaud (vocals). Set in a Victorian haunted mental institution called Haverghast Asylum, Gates of Delirium was the first Midnight Syndicate disc to feature the fictitious Haverghast family, a theme the band would revisit on future discs such as The 13th Hour and Bloodlines.  Gavin Goszka has since called Gates of Delirium "a personal favorite" from the Midnight Syndicate library.

During the 2001 Halloween weekend, six of the band's mp3 singles were in the Top 20 for all of MP3.com (#1, No. 2, No. 7, No. 10, No. 12, and No. 19) registering over 100,000 listens in three days. The title track from Born of the Night remained at No. 1 for over a week with two tracks from Gates of Delirium maintaining their positions in the Top 40 as well.

In August 2002, the band released their fifth studio album Vampyre.  The vampire-themed disc was the first Midnight Syndicate disc to feature a cover designed by fantasy artist Keith Parkinson.

By this time, the band's popularity with role-playing gamers who used their discs as background for their sessions had grown to where they were exhibiting at gaming conventions.  It was at one of these conventions that the band was approached by designers from Wizards of the Coast. The result was 2003's Dungeons & Dragons: Official Role-playing Soundtrack, the first officially licensed soundtrack to the classic roleplaying game of the same name.  The album (whose fantasy themes were a departure from previous releases) was generally well received by music critics and the gaming community and helped the band build their following in Europe.  Some of the tracks were later used in computer games Baldur's Gate - Dark Alliance II and Shadowbane expansions Rise of Chaos and Throne of Oblivion.

In August 2005, the band returned to darker themes with their seventh CD entitled The 13th Hour. Featuring vocal effects by Lily Lane of the horror-rock band Lazy Lane and cover art by Keith Parkinson the disc is set in a haunted Victorian mansion and features tracks like: Fallen Grandeur, Grisly Reminder, and Family Secrets. The album would become one of their most popular titles, winning awards in the gaming industry, and inspiring a prequel-themed release, 2021's Bloodlines.

Out of the Darkness (Retrospective: 1994–1999) was released in 2006 and featured re-recorded versions of tracks from Midnight Syndicate, Born of the Night, and Realm of Shadows, along with some of Edward Douglas’ early horror film scores including The Dead Matter (1995). Fantasy artist Rob Alexander designed the cover.  The track Into The Abyss  was featured as the outtro on the Misfits 2013 live album, DEA.D ALIVE!  In 2015, the album was included in Rue Morgue Magazine's 50 Essential Horror Albums - Discs That Created, Evolved, or Defined Genre Music Through the Decades.

The Rage and The Dead Matter (2007–2010)
In early 2007, the band temporarily shifted from creating "soundtracks to imaginary films" to composing music for actual projects when they completed the score to Robert Kurtzman's, The Rage and wrote music for Universal Orlando's Halloween Horror Nights 17's Carnival of Carnage. The Rage: Original Motion Picture Soundtrack was released in February 2008.

In September 2007, Douglas returned to filmmaking as director, co-producer, and composer of an updated remake of his 1995 horror film, The Dead Matter. The remake stars Andrew Divoff, Tom Savini, and Jason Carter, and was co-produced by Kurtzman. During this time, Gavin Goszka started a solo project called Parlormuse which featured Victorian era songs re-recorded in a modern folk rock style.

In August 2008, the band released The Dead Matter: Cemetery Gates, a CD of music inspired by the themes from the new The Dead Matter movie. Midnight Syndicate's first two music videos were made for the songs Dark Legacy and Lost from the disc.  In the finale of the music video for Dark Legacy, Edward Douglas and Gavin Goszka are shown playing on stage at the historic Phantasy Theater in Cleveland, Ohio. It marked the first time they had played together live.

On July 30, 2010 The Dead Matter movie was released in DVD along with a Midnight Syndicate "greatest hits-style" compilation CD called Halloween Music Collection and an EP entitled The Dark Masquerade featuring gothic artist Destini Beard performing operatic vocals and lyrics to various Midnight Syndicate recordings. The Dead Matter: Original Motion Picture Soundtrack was also released in July 30.  The CD featured the score by Edward Douglas, other music that appeared in the film, and several remixes of Midnight Syndicate tracks by other artists.

The 2010s and Midnight Syndicate Live! (2010-2019)
In August 2011, the band released its fourteenth studio album, entitled Carnival Arcane.  The theme of the CD surrounds a fictional turn of the century traveling circus called The Lancaster Rigby Carnival.  The CD was inspired by research into carnivals of that time period and Ray Bradbury's Something Wicked This Way Comes. In 2012, the album won the Best CD category in the 2012 Rondo Hatton Classic Horror Awards.

In August 2012 Destini Beard released the followup to her 2010 EP, The Dark Masquerade. The full-length CD once again featured Destini's original vocals and lyrics blended with previously recorded Midnight Syndicate tracks. The disc featured a remix by Pat Berdysz of the Electro-industrial band Encoder and an original song written and performed entirely by Destini entitled, My Last Goodbye.  The CD is set in a haunted Victorian hotel and features cover art by Destini's father, fantasy artist, Ed Beard, Jr.  In February 2013, the band's song Into The Abyss from their Out of the Darkness CD was featured as an outtro on the Misfits live album, DEA.D Alive.

In 2013, the band scored the horror creature feature film, Axe Giant: The Revenge of Paul Bunyan.  The film is a dark contemporary take on the legend of Paul Bunyan and premiered on the Syfy Channel in June 2013.  In July 2013 the band released a new studio album entitled Monsters of Legend. Featuring images from Bride of Frankenstein and Werewolf of London on the cover, the album was influenced by classic Universal Monsters, Hammer Films, Amicus Productions, and Euro Horror films from the 60's and 70's as well as composers like James Bernard, Bernard Herrmann, and Max Steiner.  The album won the Best CD category in the 2014 Rondo Hatton Classic Horror Awards.

In March 2014, the band announced plans for a series of live multimedia concerts entitled Midnight Syndicate Live! Legacy of Shadows that would run at the amusement park Cedar Point's HalloWeekends event beginning in September 2014.  They also announced that they would be teaming up with special effects artist, Robert Kurtzman who worked on The Dead Matter as well as director Gary Jones and Face Off contestants, Beki Ingram and David Greathouse. The show opened on September 12 to very positive reviews.  The Akron Beacon Journal described it as "Part concert, part movie, part theater, part just plain creepy," going on to call it "top-notch and ambitious."

In September 2015, the band released, a "Yuletide-inspired" album entitled, Christmas: A Ghostly Gathering.  Billed as "the band’s unique twist on classic Christmas carols blended with new and original material," the album was seen as an effort to take the band's Halloween-associated sound and apply it to a Christmas theme.  In a November 2016 interview, Edward Douglas called it "one of my favorite albums Midnight Syndicate has ever done."

In April 2016, the band announced that it was teaming up with tabletop game designers, Twilight Creations, to create a soundtrack for that company's award-winning zombie apocalypse-themed board game Zombies!!!.  The Zombies!!! Official Board Game Soundtrack was released in September of that year.  The album was praised for its effectiveness for use with the game as well as its appropriateness for use as background music during the Halloween season.

In September 2017, the band returned to Cedar Point with a new production of their Midnight Syndicate Live! show.  Staged inside the Jack Aldrich Theater, the show once again ran as a part of the amusement park's HalloWeekends event.  They followed it up in 2018 with a new show entitled Midnight Syndicate: Conspiracy of Shadows which WBLZ Media's Daniel James called the band's "most ambitious project to date" and "one of the best stage shows in the country." In the band's blog, Gavin Goszka mentioned that the 2018 show marked the conclusion of a loose trilogy that consisted of the band's first three productions at Cedar Point.

In March 2019, the band announced that they would be returning to Cedar Point for a third consecutive year.  Gavin stated that the new show would be "taking things in a new direction," with Edward Douglas adding that he felt it was something that would appeal to fans of Twilight Zone.

Recent projects (2020–present)
In 2020, plans for a fourth consecutive Midnight Syndicate Live! show at Cedar Point were canceled due to the coronavirus pandemic. In August, a limited-edition album, entitled Music of Halloween Horror Nights was made available at the Universal Studios Florida Halloween Horror Nights Tribute Store. The album featured songs created by Midnight Syndicate specifically for Halloween Horror Nights in addition to other tracks that had been used at the event and on the event's websites since 1999. 500 hand-numbered copies were made available on red vinyl. Music of Halloween Horror Nights sold out in less than three hours.

Midnight Syndicate released its first live album in June 2021. Entitled Live Shadows, the album consisted of new material and newly arranged live versions of music from throughout the band's career. Recorded at Midnight Syndicate Live! shows from 2014 through 2019, the album was released along with music videos that showcased the productions the group had performed at Cedar Point's HalloWeekends to date.

In August 2021, Midnight Syndicate released its fourteenth studio album, Bloodlines, which debuted at #12 on Billboard'''s Classical Crossover charts. Created as a prequel to 2005's The 13th Hour, the album's last track, Sands of Time, is meant to segue directly into the first track of The 13th Hour. Bloodlines expanded upon the backstory of the Haverghast family that was established on both the Gates of Delirium and The 13th Hour albums.Midnight Syndicate returns to HalloWeekends with plenty of new music in store The Plain Dealer, Anne Nickoloff, September 28, 2021

In September of 2021, Universal Studios Florida reissued 2020's Music of Halloween Horror Nights album on limited-edition orange vinyl featuring new artwork and four additional tracks on the digital download version. Once again, the album sold out within days of its release. A third limited-edition vinyl pressing of Music of Halloween Horror Nights was released on October 5th. This picture disc version featured the iconic Halloween Horror Nights character, Jack the Clown, on the cover and included a slightly different lineup of songs. Edward Douglas and Gavin Goszka commemorated this particular reissue with a signing at Universal Studios Florida which also included the albums' cover artists, Jose Pardo and Luis Orazi. That September also marked the return of the band to Cedar Point's HalloWeekends event where they staged a remount of their 2018 Midnight Syndicate: Conspiracy of Shadows multimedia performances.

To celebrate their 25th Anniversary in 2022, the band relaunched its Legions of the Night fan community featuring a fan-generated "best of" compilation entitled Legions of the Night Volume 1. In August, Universal Orlando and Midnight Syndicate teamed up again to release another limited-edition vinyl album. The new album, entitled Legendary Truth: The Collective, featured packaging that referenced elements from the event's past including: previous icons, Legions of Horror, and the in-park experience, Legendary Truth: The Collective. Additionally, in 2022, the band commemorated it's 25-year association with Cedar Point's HalloWeekends by producing and performing a new show entitled, Midnight Hour: 25 Years of HalloWeekends and Midnight Syndicate. A compilation album entitled, HalloWeekends: 25 Years of Terror Together was released and sold in the park. The new album featured songs that had been heavily used at the park over the previous 25 years as well as new music from the Midnight Hour show.

Musicianship
Influences
Douglas cites film composers Danny Elfman, James Horner, John Carpenter, Hans Zimmer, heavy metal acts King Diamond and Black Sabbath, radio dramas, and horror film scores as primary musical influences for Midnight Syndicate.  He has cited Hammer Film Productions, the art of Joseph Vargo, Alchemy Gothic, and Keith Parkinson, the books of Stephen King, Tales From the Crypt comics, and Role-playing games as sources of inspiration.FEARnet interview with Edward Douglas, October 31, 2008.Black Gate Black Gate Interview with Edward Douglas, July 29, 2010  He has said that Joseph Vargo's input was critical on the Born of the Night CD. In a 2010 interview, Goszka cited similar musical influences (Elfman, Carpenter, King Diamond, and Sabbath) as well as Dead Can Dance.

Legacy
Impact on Halloween music and haunted attraction industry
The group's music is commonly used as atmosphere for Halloween-themed events, stores, and parties (including Hugh Hefner's), as well as home decorating for trick-or-treating.  Heather Adler credits them as helping to legitimize the genre of Halloween music (music for the Halloween holiday), elevating standards in the genre, and inspiring other musicians to create similar projects.Heather Adler, "Haunted Harmonies", Rue Morgue (Toronto, ON), Issue 50, Pg. 131Trevor Tuminski, "Hymns from the House of Horror", Rue Morgue (Toronto, ON), Issue 100, Pg.49. On September 11, 2009, AOL Radio released a list of the Top 10 Best Halloween Music CDs as ranked by AOL/CBS Radio listeners. Three of the ten CDs were Midnight Syndicate discs (Born of the Night No. 8, Realm of Shadows No. 4, and Vampyre No. 3), ranking behind Danny Elfman's The Nightmare Before Christmas and John Carpenter's Halloween soundtrack. In 2015, Rue Morgue Magazine cited Midnight Syndicate's continued influence in the haunted attraction industry as well their "entrenchment" in the celebration of the Halloween season among their reasons for including Out of the Darkness (Retrospective: 1994–1999) among their 50 Essential Horror Albums - Discs That Created, Evolved, or Defined Genre Music Through the Decades.

Midnight Syndicate was the first company to produce soundtracks of quality specifically for the haunted attraction industry.John Horton, "Scary Music Writers Accomplish Their Ghouls", The Plain Dealer (Cleveland, OH), October 17, 2006, Sec. A, Pg. A1.  In 2005, Leonard Pickel, editor of Haunted Attraction Magazine estimated that "75-90% of the attractions in the industry had at least one Midnight Syndicate CD." Their music is also used by amusement parks like Universal Orlando, Busch Gardens, Kings Island, Six Flags, Cedar Point, and Kennywood Park hold Halloween-themed events such as Thorpe Park Fright Nights, Halloween Horror Nights, HalloWeekends, Howl-O-Scream, and Fright Fest.  In the liner notes to 2020's, Music of Halloween Horror Nights album, Vice President of Entertainment, Art and Design at Universal Orlando, T.J. Mannarino said, "It is difficult to overemphasize how much the music of Midnight Syndicate played in the historic success of Halloween Horror Nights."Midnight Syndicate teams with Universal Studios to release new Music of Halloween Horror Nights album Coaster Nation, Dan Hower, August 26, 2020 In 2020, Midnight Syndicate received a Lifetime Achievement Award from the haunted attraction website, City Blood.

Impact on role-playing game industry
Midnight Syndicate has a significant following in the role-playing game community.Jeffrey Lee, "Background Music for Role-playing Games," Examiner, August 5, 2009  Their Dungeons & Dragons CD broke previous sales records for gaming soundtracks in its first month.  Their The 13th Hour CD won the Origins Award for Best Gaming Accessory presented by the Academy of Adventure Game Art & Design, marking the first time a role-playing soundtrack or music CD had won the award.  The 13th Hour also became the first music CD to win an award at the ENnies, a fan-based annual award show for role-playing game publishers and products.  In 2007, Midnight Syndicate teamed up with Goodman Games to produce Cages of Delirium a Dungeon Crawl Classics adventure based on Gates of Delirium which came packaged with the CD. The Cages of Delirium module was nominated for an ENnie Award as well as the band's Carnival Arcane album in 2012, their Monsters of Legend album in 2014, and their Zombies!!! Official Board Game Soundtrack in 2016.

Distribution
When record labels and distributors rejected the band's first two CDs, Douglas began building his own distribution network by selling CDs out of his van with Goszka and cold-calling hundreds of stores.Jennifer McKevitt, "Art of Darkness", News Herald (Mentor, OH), October 29, 2006, Sec. E, Pg.E1.  Today Midnight Syndicate's CDs are self-distributed to thousands of retailers worldwide through Entity Productions, Inc. and its partners, making them one of the largest distributors of Halloween-themed music.Carl E. Feather, "A little night music", Star Beacon (Ashtabula, OH), October 30, 2006, Sec. B, Pg. B1.  In addition to Dee Snider's Halloween-themed music act, Van Helsing's Curse, Entity Productions also distributed the 2010 version of The Dead Matter movie.

Discography
Studio albums
 Midnight Syndicate (1997)
 Born of the Night (1998)
 Realm of Shadows (2000)
 Gates of Delirium (2001)
 Vampyre (2002)
 Dungeons & Dragons (2003)
 The 13th Hour (2005)
 The Dead Matter: Cemetery Gates (2008)
 Carnival Arcane (2011)
 Monsters of Legend (2013)
 Christmas: A Ghostly Gathering (2015)
 Zombies!!! Official Board Game Soundtrack (2016)
 Bloodlines (2021)

Soundtrack albums
 The Rage: Original Motion Picture Soundtrack (2008)
 The Dead Matter: Original Motion Picture Soundtrack (2010)
 Axe Giant: Original Motion Picture Soundtrack (2013)

Reissues
 Out of the Darkness (Retrospective: 1994–1999) (2006)
 Halloween Music Collection (2010)
 Music of Halloween Horror Nights (2020)
 Legendary Truth: The Collective (2022)
 HalloWeekends: 25 Years of Terror Together (2022)

Collaborative albums
 The Dark Masquerade with Destini Beard (2010)
 A Time Forgotten with Destini Beard (2012)

Live albums
 Live Shadows (2021)

Film
 The Dead Matter (2010)

In popular culture
Midnight Syndicate's composer credits include the scores to the films The Rage, The Dead Matter, and Axe Giant.  Additionally, their music has been featured in television programs such as Happy!, Barbara Walters' 10 Most Fascinating People of 2002, The Ellen DeGeneres Show, The Today Show, Monday Night Football, NBA on TNT, Syfy's The Possessed, and Travel Channel's haunted attraction-themed reality show, Making Monsters.IMDB.com listing for Midnight Syndicate  The music has also been used as theme music in independent horror films like Dead & Rotting, Revamped, Witchouse 3: Demon Fire and Song of the Vampire (AKA Vampire Resurrection), and on the Dungeons & Dragons-based web series, Critical Role.

It is used in the audio drama, The Byron Chronicles.
Newer episodes of the Byron Chronicles are available at the creators blog.

A lot of Midnight Syndicate's music has also been played at some popular Theme Parks' Halloween events in the United Kingdom such as at Alton Towers Scarefest and Thorpe Park Fright Nights''.

See also
 Nox Arcana
 Destini Beard

References

External links
 

American dark wave musical groups
American gothic rock groups
Rock music groups from Ohio
Dark ambient music groups
Musical groups established in 1997
Neoclassical dark wave musical groups
People from Chardon, Ohio
Origins Award winners
Musical groups from Cleveland